Roger Batty is a British historian who is Professor at Keio University. Batty specializes in ancient history, particularly the relationship between Romans and "barbarians" beyond the Danube in classical antiquity.

Biography
Batty received his Lit. Hum from The Queen's College, Oxford in 1984 and his D.Phil in ancient history from University of Oxford in 1990. From 1990 to 1994, Battty was the speechwriter for Mostafa Kamal Tolba, Executive Director of the United Nations Environment Programme in Nairobi, Kenya. Batty has worked and studied in Geneva, Switzerland; Bucuresti, Romania; and Sofia, Bulgaria. His Rome and the Nomads: The Pontic-Danubian Realm in Antiquity (2007) was published by Oxford University Press and received to wide acclaim. Batty is Professor at the Faculty of Economics at Keio University.

Selected works
 Rome and the Nomads: The Pontic-Danubian Realm in Antiquity, 2007

See also
 Mark Shchukin

Sources
 

Year of birth missing (living people)
Living people
Alumni of The Queen's College, Oxford
British historians
British non-fiction writers
Historians of antiquity
Alumni of the University of Oxford